"When Am I Going to Make a Living" is a song by English band Sade from their debut studio album, Diamond Life (1984). It was released on 14 May 1984 as the album's second single.

Reception
Frank Guan of Vulture commented, "Few songs capture the sense of living amidst dealers and liars in a precarious economy better than this early single, nor better express the cheeky optimism that things will get better once we both take individual responsibility and see ourselves collectively. Written during the Thatcher years, it's only gained in relevance in the three decades since."

Track listings

UK 7-inch single
A. "When Am I Going to Make a Living"
B. "Should I Love You"

UK 12-inch maxi single
A. "When Am I Going to Make a Living"
B1. "Why Can't We Live Together"
B2. "Should I Love You"

Charts

References

1984 singles
1984 songs
Epic Records singles
Sade (band) songs
Songs written by Sade (singer)
Songs written by Stuart Matthewman